Dybala (more commonly Dybała in Polish) is a surname of West Slavic origin, e.g. from the verb dybać. Notable people with the surname include:
 Ignacy Dybała (1926–2016), Polish footballer
 Matej Dybala (born 1999), Slovak footballer
 Paulo Dybala (born 1993), Argentine footballer

See also
 
 Dąbal
 Dybal

Polish-language surnames
Slovak-language surnames